The OVRA, whose most probable name was Organization for Vigilance and Repression of Anti-Fascism, was the secret police of the Kingdom of Italy, founded in 1927 under the regime of Fascist dictator Benito Mussolini and during the reign of King Victor Emmanuel III. The OVRA was the Italian precursor of the German Gestapo. Mussolini's secret police were assigned to stop any anti-fascist activity or sentiment. Approximately 50,000 OVRA agents infiltrated most aspects of domestic life in Italy. The OVRA, headed by Arturo Bocchini, never appeared in any official document, so the official name of the organization still remains unclear.

Origin 
In the aftermath of the attempted assassination of Mussolini by the young Anteo Zamboni, in Bologna on 31 October 1926, a swath of repressive legislation was swiftly enacted by the Italian government. All political parties, associations and organizations opposed to the Fascist regime were dissolved, and everybody who was proven to have "committed or expressed intention to commit actions directed to violently subvert the social, economic or national order or undermine national security or to oppose or obstruct the actions of the Government" could be sent into exile in remote locations by the police.

On November 25, 1926, the new Legge di Difesa dello Stato (State Defense Law) instituted a Tribunale Speciale (Special Court) to try those who were accused of being "enemies of the State", and sentence them to harsh prison terms or even to death, as the death penalty had also been restored under the new law.

Priority was given to the reorganization of the National Police Force, known as Pubblica Sicurezza (PS), under career police officer Arturo Bocchini. The new Code of Laws concerning Public Security (Testo Unico delle Leggi di Pubblica Sicurezza, TULPS) enacted in 1926 and revised in 1931, specified a "Department of Political Police" as a special division of the force with the aim of controlling and preventing political dissent. Later, this division came to be known as OVRA, although its existence remained secret until December 1930 when the official press agency Agenzia Stefani released a statement quoting the OVRA as a "special section" of the police force.

Keeping the fascist regime in power 
Bocchini appointed inspector Francesco Nudi as head of the OVRA. Nudi was later replaced by Guido Leto.

The OVRA compiled files on around 130,000 potential subversives with the aid of a network of approximately 100,000 informants, and by 1930 they were organising around 20,000 raids each week. It is believed that about 6,000 of the people arrested by the OVRA, mainly communists and members of the Giustizia e Libertà, were either tried by the Tribunale Speciale or sent into exile on remote Mediterranean islands. The conditions in these places were extremely poor, so many anti-fascists simply left Italy for their own safety.

It is known that Heinrich Himmler met with Bocchini repeatedly and modeled the organization of the Gestapo on that of the OVRA. A secret protocol was signed on April 2, 1936, by the heads of the two police organisations, to further cooperation and collaboration.

Spying on the Vatican 
A major duty for the OVRA was spying on Pope Pius XI, as the Roman Catholic Church was an extremely powerful institution in Italian life that the Fascist regime never controlled, instead having a partnership with. It was a common practice of the OVRA to catch Roman Catholic priests in flagrante delicto and blackmail them into spying for the OVRA, which was therefore always very well informed about the affairs of the Holy See.  The American historian David Kertzer described the OVRA's spy network within the Vatican as "robust", comprising four highly placed clerics and a number of lay Vatican employees. Mussolini was fascinated by reports of homosexual activity among senior Catholic clerics and always had them sent to his office for him to read.

The OVRA had a very long file on the Pope's Master of Ceremonials, his close friend Monsignor Camillo Caccia Dominioni. He was known to sexually molest young boys, despite the Pope being aware of this, at least from 1926 on. Another homosexual cleric was Monsignor Ricardo Sanz de Samper, the Prefect of the Pope's Household and papal majordomo, whose fondness for sex with young boys became so open that even Pius was forced to dismiss him in 1928. Another long OVRA file was on the Jesuit Father Pietro Tacchi Venturi, the Pope's emissary to Mussolini, who often had "illicit" relations with young men and had been wounded in a lover's quarrel, which he tried to pass off as an anti-fascist assassination attempt. The Pope retained Venturi as his preferred liaison with Mussolini, despite this obvious fabrication. Another senior cleric blackmailed by the OVRA was Monsignor Enrico Pucci, the chief of the Vatican press department, who worked as an informer for the OVRA from October 1927 onward. Pucci as a rule did not see the Pope very often.  However, he met on a daily basis with the Pope's advisers, to get directions for the editorial stance of the Vatican media. This provided the OVRA with much information. One of the most important informers in the Vatican remains anonymous. His OVRA file simply describes him as the "noted Vatican informer". Kertzer wrote that judging from the high-quality intelligence he provided, the "noted Vatican informer" must have been someone very senior, so that his name was never written down.

During the Second World War 
During World War II, the OVRA was used by Mussolini to control resistance groups in the Balkans (Tito's National Liberation Army especially) prior to the 1943 armistice and withdrawal. In 1943, with the Allied invasion of Italy, the OVRA began to recruit double agents to infiltrate the British SOE, but these efforts failed to stop Mussolini's ouster. With the establishment of the Italian Social Republic in northern Italy, many OVRA agents flocked to this state led by Mussolini, fighting until Mussolini was executed by Italian partisans on April 28, 1945. OVRA agents were favourite targets of communist partisans, as they were a symbol of the fascist government.

Legacy 
After the war ended the OVRA was officially disbanded, but a decree issued on April 26, 1945, stated that the CPC should be maintained and "updated with all the information pertaining to anybody whose political activity is aimed at breaking the laws and regulations enacted by the democratic Government against neo-Fascism, anarchists who are by definition against any law and government, and political activists whose moral depravity and contempt of law could prompt them to instigate unrest or commit acts of terrorism". Later, a division of the PS named Servizio Informazioni Speciali ("Special Informations Service", better known as SIS) was set up by the new Minister of Interior, the Socialist Giuseppe Romita, as a result of a new reorganization of the Police offices, with the task of taking over the management of the CPC and investigating politically motivated crimes and other felonies related to that particular time (such as black marketeering, etc.), and that many of the former officers of the OVRA were being reinstated as members of the new SIS. Even the person appointed as head of SIS was Inspector General Santoro, one of Leto's former deputies.

Most of the laws and regulations of the old TULPS of 1931 were kept in force by the Italian Republic, and Leto (the former boss of OVRA aforementioned) was later reinstated as a fully fledged national Police officer, and entrusted with the supervision and coordination of police academies in postwar Italy.

See also 
 Servizio Informazioni Militari – Fascist Italy's military intelligence service
 Gestapo – Germany's secret police
 Political-Social Brigade - Spain's secret police
 The Conformist
 Milice - collaborationist police militia in Vichy France

References

Sources 
 
 
 

20th century in Italy
Defunct law enforcement agencies of Italy
Secret police
Italian Fascism
Anti-communist organizations
Antimafia